The Oenotrians (Οἴνωτρες, meaning "tribe led by Oenotrus" or "people from the land of vines - Οἰνωτρία") were an ancient Italic people who inhabited a territory in Southern Italy from Paestum to southern Calabria. By the sixth century BC, the Oenotrians had been absorbed into other Italic tribes.

According to Pausanias, Dionysius of Halicarnassus and Eusebius, Oenotria was named after Oenotrus, the youngest of the fifty sons of Lycaon who migrated there from Arcadia in Peloponnese, Greece.
According to Antoninus Liberalis and Hellanicus, their arrival triggered the migration of the Elymians to Sicily. The settlement of the Greeks with the first stable colonies, such as Metapontum, founded on a native one (Metabon), pushed the Oenotrians inland. From these positions a "wear and tear war" was started off with the Greek colonies, which they plundered more than once. From the 5th century BC onwards, they disappeared under the pressure of an Oscan people, the Lucanians. Virgil mentions them as the settlers of Hesperia whose descendants now call their land Italy. They are generally depicted as belonging to the Pelasgians. Pliny the Elder mentions that "...opposite to Velia are Poiitia and Isacia, both known by one name, that of Oenotrides, a proof that Italy was formerly possessed by the Oenotrians".

A likely derivation of the ethnonym Oenotrian would be the Greek οἶνος (oinos), "wine", as the Oenotrians inhabited a territory rich in vineyards, with Oenotria (or Enotria) being extended to refer to the entirety of Southern Italy. Hesychius mentions the word οἴνωτρον (oinōtron), a kind of a vine stake.

Language and origins 

According to a traditionalist view, the Oenotrians represent the southern branch of a very old and different ethno-linguistic layer from the proto-Latin one, which would have occupied the Tyrrhenian sea area from Liguria to Sicily (Ligurian/Sicanian layer).

It used to be thought that the Oenotrians might have spoken a pre-Indo-European language. In 1991 inscriptions dating from the 6th or the 5th century BC were discovered in the ancient Oenotrian settlement of Tortora, Calabria, and revealed that the Oenotrians spoke an Italic language.

See also 
 King Italus
Ancient people of Italy

References 

Ancient peoples of Italy
Greek tribes
Pelasgians